Victor Lobry (born 16 June 1995) is a French professional footballer who plays as a midfielder for  club AS Saint-Étienne.

Career
A youth product of Reims, Lobry spent his early career in amateur leagues in France before signing with Pau on 13 June 2020. He made his professional debut with Pau in a 3–0 Ligue 2 loss to Valenciennes on 22 August 2020.

On 20 July 2022, Lobry signed a two-year contract with Saint-Étienne.

References

External links
 
 Eurosport Profile

1995 births
Living people
People from Soissons
French footballers
Association football midfielders
Stade de Reims players
Limoges FC players
Tours FC players
US Avranches players
Pau FC players
AS Saint-Étienne players
Ligue 2 players
Championnat National players
Championnat National 2 players
Championnat National 3 players
Sportspeople from Aisne
Footballers from Hauts-de-France